Uzair Cassiem (born 17 March 1990) is a South African rugby union player for French side Bayonne in the Prod2 competition.

Cassiem, who usually plays as a loose forward, previously represented the Golden Lions and Falcons.

In 2013, he was included in a South Africa President's XV team that played in the 2013 IRB Tbilisi Cup and won the tournament after winning all three matches. Cassiem finished joint top try scorer with two tries.

He was a member of the Pumas side that won the Vodacom Cup for the first time in 2015, beating Western Province 24–7 in the final. Cassiem appeared in all ten of their matches during the season.

Despite initially signing a contract to join Kimberley-based side Griquas prior to the 2016 season, he was included in the training squad of Super Rugby side the Cheetahs and it was later confirmed that he would remain with them for the entire 2016 season.

On 29 May 2018, Cassiem would leave South Africa to sign for Welsh region Scarlets in the Pro14 from the 2018-19 season.

On 4 April 2021, Cassiem would travel to France to join with Bayonne in the Prod2 competition from the 2021-22 season.

References

External links
 

South African rugby union players
Living people
1990 births
Golden Lions players
Falcons (rugby union) players
Pumas (Currie Cup) players
Rugby union flankers
People from the Western Cape
South Africa international rugby union players
Cheetahs (rugby union) players
Free State Cheetahs players
Scarlets players
Aviron Bayonnais players
Rugby union players from the Western Cape